The Baloch diaspora() refers to Baloch people, and their descendants, who have emigrated to places outside the Balochistan region of South-West Asia – a region stretching from southwestern Pakistan to southeastern Iran and southern Afghanistan. The Baloch diaspora is found throughout the Middle East, South Asia, Turkmenistan, East Africa, Europe, North America and in other parts of the world.

The collapse of History
The first British researchers did not carefully describe the origin of the Baloch tribes, or perhaps this was the action of some kind of political system, the  British Empire, and this was deliberate, dividing the Baloch tribes in the historical science, which led to the misconception about the origin of the Baloch people.
This widespread propaganda is mainly adhered to by provocateurs from Iran and Pakistan, many Baloch tribes who are Balochi were allegedly considered non-Balochi in the historical literature, and today they are not included in the Balochi list.

List of Baloch tribes

 Rind
 Bugti
 Raisani 
 Mirani
 Gichki
 Buledi
 Naushervani
 Baranzai
 Dodai
Analyzing the history of the aforementioned tribes, these tribes once had an independent state in their history. The provocation is directed against Baloch history in order to drown out the national interests of the Baloch people.

Pakistan

Within Pakistan, there are significant numbers of Baloch tribes that have migrated partially or totally and settled in regions outside of Balochistan, mostly into Sindh. Some have also migrated into southern Punjab, especially in the Saraiki speaking regions as well as southeast Khyber Pakhtunkhwa. Many have become entirely assimilated into their host cultures. The Zardari tribe Jatoi tribe and Chandio and Magsi tribes for example are now culturally Sindhi Baloch. The Talpur dynasty is a Baloch tribe that ruled over Sindh. Meanwhile, the Legharis of Sindh and Southern Punjab speak both Sindhi and Saraiki.

Worldwide populations

Middle East

There are large numbers of Baloch living in Oman, the UAE and other Arab states of the Persian Gulf.

Europe
There are also significant populations in Norway, Sweden, and other European countries.

Turkmenistan

There is a population of Baloch in Turkmenistan who migrated there in the early 20th century, estimated in 1997 to number between 38,000 and 40,000.

East Africa
There is also a small but historic Baloch community in East Africa, left over from when the Sultanate of Muscat ruled over Zanzibar and the Swahili Coast. These migrants were largely from Makran and southern Balochistan. A majority of them still have ties to their families back in Makran.one of the most famous Baluchi people in Tanzania is Rostam Aziz. In Uganda one Balochi called Jalalkhan finally settled at Kaberamaido in eastern Uganda and also  Kamuli district at Nduria village. He planted many mango trees and other fruits in both places and they are famous places for mangoes to this day.

India

There are also a number of settlements of Baloch in India, mainly in Uttar Pradesh and Gujarat. They now speak either Balochi Urdu, Gujarati and Kutchi, depending on their location.

North America

Smaller but sizeable Baloch communities are found throughout various states in the United States and Canada. Baloch immigrants in North America have formed their own cultural associations and tend to keep the community active through social occasions.

See also
 Overseas Pakistani
 Sindhi Baloch
 Punjabi Baloch
 Baluch of India
 List of Baloch tribes

References

Further reading
 Kokaislová, Pavla and Petr Kokaisl. Ethnic Identity of The Baloch People. Central Asia and The Caucasus. Journal of Social and Political Studies. Volume 13, Issue 3, 2012, p. 45-55. .
 Nicolini, Beatrice. The Baluch Role in the Persian Gulf during the Nineteenth and Twentieth Centuries, Comparative Studies of South Asia, Africa and the Middle East – Volume 27, Number 2, 2007, pp. 384–396
 Nicolini, Beatrice, The Makran-Baluch-African Network in Zanzibar and East Africa during the XIXth Century, African and Asian Studies, Volume 5, Numbers 3–4, 2006, pp. 347–370(24)
 Baloch Nationalism: Its Origin and Development, Taj Mohammad Breseeg, 2004

 
Pakistani diaspora
Diaspora
Diaspora